Clypeaster humilis is a species of sea urchin in the Family Clypeasteridae. This species was first scientifically described in 1778 by the German biologist Nathanael Gottfried Leske. It occurs in the tropical Indo-Pacific region.

Description
Its shape is pentagonal and it is slightly longer than it is broad. The margin is quite thick and the petaloid area is raised above the rest of the surface. The individual petals are closed and the petaloid area occupies less than half the width of the test. The oral (under) surface is somewhat concave and the food grooves are long and deeply incised. The spines are short, with the primaries hardly exceeding the length of the secondaries. When living, this sea biscuit is greenish-grey or brownish, the petaloid area sometimes being darker brown; the bare test is yellowish or beige.

Distribution
This species is found in the western Indo-Pacific region, its range extending from the Red Sea and  Persian Gulf to Malaysia, New Caledonia and northern Australia.

References 

Animals described in 1778
Clypeaster